Myrtle Beach Speedway (originally named Rambi Raceway), was built in 1958 and was located on U.S. Route 501 near Myrtle Beach, South Carolina.

The speedway was a semi-banked asphalt oval track that spans .The NASCAR Cup Series competed at the Speedway from 1958 through 1965. The NASCAR Busch Series (now the Xfinity Series) raced at Myrtle Beach Speedway from 1988 to 2000.

Over the years, Myrtle Beach Speedway has been the training grounds for some of NASCAR's biggest stars including Jeff Gordon (former Busch Series track record holder). All four generations of Pettys (Lee, Richard, Kyle, and Adam) and three generations of Earnhardts (Ralph, Dale Sr., Dale Jr., and Kelley) have taken a green flag around the asphalt oval that spans .

History

Rambi Raceway opened as a dirt track in 1958.

The track hosted one NASCAR Convertible Series event in 1958 and one NASCAR Grand National East Series race in 1972.

Nick Lucas bought the track in 1968, paving it in 1974. Billy Hardee became a co-owner in 1987.

NASCAR Southeast Series had run 17 races at the facility between 1991 and 2004, with the Myrtle Beach 400 Late Model race (originally an All Pro event) beginning in 1993.  Originally a 400-lap touring race, the race settled down to 250 laps with heat races combined for 400 laps, originally set for Thanksgiving weekend, but later moved to the week before Thanksgiving in order to allow competitors to participate in the NASCAR Late Model Thanksgiving Classic at Southern National Motorsports Park in Lucana, North Carolina.

The Busch Series race (the Myrtle Beach 250) in 2000 was the last major NASCAR event at the track.

Till 2020 the NASCAR Whelen All-American Series race on Saturday nights from late February through November. The track also runs various other classes of racing including Late Model Charger, Super Trucks and Mini Stocks.  The speedway is home of the Myrtle Beach 400, IceBreaker 200, NASCAR Racing Experience, Monster Jam, NOPI Nationals and Horry County Fair with recent additions of Wheels of Destruction Thrill Show and the Myrtle Beach BikeFest. 

In a deal that closed April, 2012, Speedway Group Inc. bought the facility, including 48 acres. Robert J. Lutz, one of the new owners, said Lt. Gov. André Bauer arranged for the deal to take place. Bauer said he wanted the track to help improve Myrtle Beach's economy with new events. Upgrades to the track were planned, and plans called for the NASCAR Racing Experience to attract drivers and tourists. One goal was another top-level race.

The NASCAR Whelen Southern Modified Tour had one race at the speedway in 2009. After merging the two NASCAR Whelen Modified Tours at the end of the 2016 season, beginning in 2017, the newly unified tour hosted three events at the track from 2017 through 2019.

CARS X-1R Pro Cup Series had 24 races at Myrtle Beach between 1998 and 2014. CARS Super Late Model Tour and CARS Late Model Stock Tour had 3 events each at the facility, between 2015 and 2018.

In May 2020, it was announced the track would close its doors for good once the season was complete as the result of a sale to a land developer.

The final race at Myrtle Beach Speedway was held in August 2020.  Sam Yarbrough won the final Late Model race while Carmen Odum and Carsyn Gillikin won their respective races in the final feature race ever held at the track. 

Originally, the land owners' plan was to demolish the facility and build hotels and condos on the property, but it was announced in early July 2021 that the company will not use the land for the original purpose, and the concept for the area fell through. Although it kept the track safe from demolition for the time being, photos taken on July 6, 2021 showed weeds and grass slowly taking over the racetrack. In December 2021, most of the track, including the track itself, most of the outside walls, and pit road were demolished, as now all that remains (as of December 31, 2021), is the frontstretch and backstretch walls that show the name of the former racetrack.

Promoters Acquire Florence Motor Speedway (Timmonsville)

In preparation for the last race, in July 2020, track promoter Steve Zacharias and business partners Brian Vause and Savannah Brotherton formed Speedway Plus Promotion LLC, acquiring from Charlie Powell the Florence Motor Speedway in Timmonsville, 75 miles from the track but in the same metropolitan market.  Sam Yarbrough, who won the last Myrtle Beach Late Model feature, won the first race at Florence with the same promoters, the 100 lap Prelude to the Southern 500.  In addition, NASCAR approved the transfer of Myrtle Beach's NASCAR sanction to Florence to start the 2021 season.  

CARS moved the traditional Myrtle Beach race to Florence in the ensuing weeks, while the Myrtle Beach 400, now the South Carolina 400 Charlie Powell Memorial, was held on the traditional date in November 2020.  The IceBreaker followed in February 2021.

The Charlie Powell Memorial 400 continues to be one of the major end of season races on the Late Model circuit, and received a major boost for its 30th edition in 2022.  NASCAR Hall of Fame member Dale Earnhardt, Jr., who raced at Myrtle Beach in his early career, participated in the event.  NASCAR and the promoters now recognise the history of the races at Myrtle Beach into the history of the Charlie Powell Memorial 400, which has seen a number of winners win at NASCAR's national level.  Earnhardt raced during the 2022-23 off-season in the Powell 400 and IceBreaker events.

Charlie Powell 400 Winners

The Myrtle Beach 400 was originally a NASCAR All Pro / Southeast Series Late Model event from 1993-95.  It moved to NASCAR-spec Late Models in 1996.  The race moved to Florence in 2020.

Sources:  Third Turn ,  |Short Track Scene , <REF> |Racing America </REF?,

References

External links
 Official Website (Florence Motor Speedway, which the promoters have taken over)
 Myrtle Beach Speedway Race Results at the Racing-Reference
 Florence Motor Speedway Race Results at the Racing-Reference
 Myrtle Beach Speedway included in iRacing

Sports venues in Horry County, South Carolina
Motorsport venues in South Carolina
NASCAR tracks
Tourist attractions in Myrtle Beach, South Carolina
Buildings and structures in Myrtle Beach, South Carolina
Sports in Myrtle Beach, South Carolina
1958 establishments in South Carolina
Sports venues completed in 1958
Defunct motorsport venues in the United States